Mahia (literally water of life) is a Moroccan Jewish alcoholic beverage distilled from dates. It is also sometimes prepared with figs.

Overview
Mahia (ماء الحياة) is a traditional Moroccan Jewish brandy distillates from fruits such as jujubes, figs, dates, grapes, and flavored with anise. Its name literally means "eau de vie" in Arabic. Originally from Morocco, it was historically produced by the Moroccan Jews before they emigrated in the second half of the 20th century. Mahia can be enjoyed as a digestif or used as a base for cocktails: it goes very well with pomegranate juice, rose water; ginger syrup or mango juice for example. It can also be infused with fennel leaves, to enhance its aniseed scent. Today, mahia very often designates adulterated alcohol in Morocco sold informally and consumed in disadvantaged neighborhoods. Even in present-day Morocco it is still traditionally associated with Morocco's Jewish community.

See also
Boukha- a similar Tunisian Jewish alcoholic beverage

References 

Sephardi Jewish cuisine
Moroccan cuisine
Jews and Judaism in Morocco
Israeli cuisine
Alcoholic drinks